Garmabad may refer to:
 Garmabad, Fars
 Garmabad, Ilam